Novella Christine Nelson (December 17, 1939 – August 31, 2017) was an American actress and singer. She established her career as a singer, both on the off-Broadway and Broadway stage and in cabaret-style locales.

Career
Starting in 1961, Nelson had a decades-long stage career, performing, directing and producing, primarily in New York. She was a featured performer on Broadway in 1970 in the musical Purlie. In 1975, Nelson directed the play La Femme Noire at The Public Theater. Her film career began at age 39 with a small part in 1977's An Unmarried Woman, and continued for the next several decades with roles in movies and television.

She may be best known for her role as Mrs. Tate in the 2002 movie Antwone Fisher.

Early life
Nelson was born on December 17, 1939 in Brooklyn, New York, to James and Evelyn (formerly Hines) Nelson. Her father was a pastor and a taxi driver. Her mother was an executive assistant at magazine publisher Women's Wear Daily.

An African American, she attended the predominantly white Brooklyn College in the late 1950s, majoring in biochemistry. She took a speech class, which was an acting course, and was asked to perform in a play. For the play she took on the role of Berenice, the housekeeper, in The Member of the Wedding by Carson McCullers. After being on stage in this and other plays, the future actress changed course becoming a theatre major.

Death
Nelson died of cancer on September 1, 2017, aged 77, in her native Brooklyn, New York.

Filmography

Film

Television

Discography

References

External links
 
 
 New York Times obituary

1938 births
2017 deaths
African-American actresses
20th-century African-American women singers
American film actresses
American stage actresses
American television actresses
Actresses from New York City
People from Brooklyn
Brooklyn College alumni
Deaths from cancer in New York (state)
21st-century African-American people
21st-century African-American women